Sittwe Airport  is an airport in Sittwe, Rakhine State, Myanmar. In Burmese it is known as စစ်တွေ လေဆိပ်.

It started as RAF Station Sittwe, a military airfield in World War II.  It was handed over to Department of Civil Aviation by International Aero Limited Company on 24 July 1947.  It was upgraded to 6,000 feet long and 140 feet wide gravel mixed asphalt runway in 1960.  The airport building was extended to 220 feet by 60 feet from 120 feet by 60 feet and it was opened on 22 March 2002. 4 feet thick asphalt concrete layer was placed on the 6000 x 150 feet runway, the 525 x 75 feet taxiway and the 600 x 300 feet apron and opened on 20 May 2009 for use of F-28 jets.

It is equipped with HF, VHF, NDB, Night Landing Facilities such as airfield lighting, approach light and remote control air ground machines.  It admits over 90,000 passengers in 2010-11 and it is expected to accommodate 150,000 passengers for arrival and departure yearly.

Airlines and destinations

Accidents and incidents
On 24 August 1972, Vickers Viscount XY-ADF of Union of Burma Airways was damaged beyond economic repair when it departed the runway on landing and the undercarriage collapsed.

References

Sources

Sittwe
Airports in Myanmar
Buildings and structures in Rakhine State